Hofbrau is a cafeteria-style food service derived from the German term Hofbräu, which originally referred to a brewery with historical ties to a royal court. Such breweries often have beer gardens where food is served.

Food 
The choice of meats offered at most hofbraus includes some form of roast beef such as prime rib, tri-tip, or brisket; some form of salt-cured meat such as corned beef, pastrami, or ham; a whole roasted bird such as turkey or chicken; and sometimes buffalo. Meals are typically served as sandwiches or as plated dinners, per the customer's preference. Sandwiches are often served au jus on sourdough rolls in French dip style, or open with beef jus or gravy ladled over the sandwich at the carvery station. Dinners often come with a side of mashed potatoes and gravy, with gravy ladled over both the potatoes and the meat. In addition, a dinner roll with butter plus a choice of hot and cold side dishes is included. Hot sides often include corn, macaroni and cheese, rice, and green beans. Cold sides often include macaroni or pasta salad, potato salad, or regular iceberg lettuce salad.

Beer on tap is commonly available at most hofbraus. Liquor is sometimes available, and most alcoholic drinks are generally inexpensive.

Layout and characteristics 
Restaurants are laid out cafeteria-style: Customers take a tray and utensils at the beginning of a long steam table, place meat orders at the carvery station, add side dishes as they move down the line, pay the cashier at the end of the line, and then seat themselves.

Expansive dining areas are generally available at larger hofbraus, and are typically used as meeting places for large groups of people who gather to eat, drink, watch sports on television, and have parties.

See also
Carvery

References

Restaurants by type